The following table shows the vegetable oil yields of common energy crops associated with biodiesel production. Included is growing zone data, relevant to farmers and agricultural scientists.
This is unrelated to ethanol production, which relies on starch, sugar and cellulose content instead of oil yields.

- Note: Chinese Tallow (Sapium sebiferum, or Triadica sebifera) is also known as the "Popcorn Tree".

Sources
Used with permission from the Global Petroleum Club 
http://journeytoforever.org/biodiesel_yield.html

See also
Bioenergy in China

References

External links
  , published in Hill, Amanda, Al Kurki, and Mike Morris. 2006. “Biodiesel: The Sustainability Dimensions.” ATTRA Publication. Butte, MT: National Center for Appropriate Technology. Pages 4–5.

Biodiesel feedstock sources
Biodiesel